Kangiqturjuaq (Inuktitut syllabics:  ᑲᖏᖅᑐᕐᔪᐊᖅ) formerly Crooks Inlet is a body of water in Nunavut's Qikiqtaaluk Region. It lies in western Hudson Strait, forming a wedge into Baffin Island's Meta Incognita Peninsula.

References

Inlets of Baffin Island